Lincoln Heights is a residential neighborhood in Northeast Washington, D.C. It is bounded by Nannie Helen Burroughs Avenue NE to the north, Blaine Street NE to the south, Division Avenue NE to the east, and 49th Street NE to the west. 

The neighborhood is almost entirely composed of the Lincoln Heights Housing Project, a 325-unit public housing complex with low-rise apartment buildings and townhouses ranging from one bedroom to four bedrooms. The complex is run by the District of Columbia Housing Authority.

References

Neighborhoods in Northeast (Washington, D.C.)